Mesembryanthemum lancifolium is a species of plants in the family Aizoaceae (stone plants). They are succulent plants.

Sources

References 

lancifolium